Gary Doyle (born January 6, 1949 in Smiths Falls, Ontario) is a former professional ice hockey goaltender.  He was selected in the fifth round of the 1969 NHL Amateur Draft, 56th overall, by the Montreal Canadiens, but he never played in the NHL.  Doyle spent one season at the University of Ottawa, and three seasons in the minor professional leagues (WHL, CHL, SHL).  Doyle did, however, play one game for the Edmonton Oilers of the WHA.

Doyle played his amateur career in the OHA, playing for the Ottawa 67's in their first year of competition.  After his retirement he became involved in municipal politics, eventually becoming county warden of Lanark County, Ontario.

External links
Doyle at HockeyDraftCentral

1949 births
Living people
Canadian ice hockey goaltenders
Edmonton Oilers (WHA) players
Ice hockey people from Ontario
Montreal Canadiens draft picks
Ottawa 67's players
People from Smiths Falls
Winston-Salem Polar Twins (SHL) players